Studio 2 LIVE was a New Zealand children's television show. It was originally named Studio 2 up until 2010, when it was renamed Studio 2 LIVE. It premiered on 22 March 2004 after WNTV (What Nows afternoon show) was cancelled. It screened weekdays  on TV2. The series ended on 1 October 2010.

Studio 2 LIVE had an interactive website called "The Hub" where the presenters chatted to fans even after the series ended on 1 October 2010. However, the website closed down in August 2011.

Presenters

 Matt Gibb (22 March 2004 - 1 October 2010)
 Dayna Vawdrey (22 March 2004 - 1 October 2010)
 Jordan Vandermade (2006 - 1 October 2010)
 Vicki Lin (2007–2009)

History

Guests
Over the years of Studio 2 Live, a number of celebrities and public figures have been guests on the show such as Rodger Bumpass and former New Zealand Prime Minister Helen Clark. She was a guest on the show in 2004.

2004
When Studio 2 premiered in March 2004 there were only 2 presenters. Matthew Gibb and Dayna Vawdrey.

2005
In 2005, NZ Idol contestant "Sela Mahe" joined the show as a roving reporter.

2006
At the start of 2006 "Jordan Vandermade" was introduced as a new co-host.

2007
Studio 2 had a Saturday show called Studio 2 Saturday which premiered in April 2007. It was hosted by Jordan Vandermade and Vicki Lin and had 3 web-ops appear on the show and interactively with The Hub
 In 2007 another new face appeared "Vicki Lin" and it also became a 6-day a week program
 In April 2007 Studio 2 Saturday released "The-Hub"
 On 22 December 2007 was the last Studio 2 Saturday show.

2008
Studio 2 returned to its regular broadcasting schedule of 5 days a week.

2009
Studio 2 starts at a new time of 3:30PM and also includes a cartoon, SpongeBob SquarePants airing randomly between 3:30PM – 4:30PM

2010
Vicki Lin does not join the Studio 2 LIVE team this year.
Studio 2 LIVE returned to TV2, 19 April.
It is revealed, that after seven years on air, this will be the final year of Studio 2. The final episode aired on 1 October 2010.

Studio 2 Saturday

Studio 2 Saturday premiered in 2007 after the New Zealand version of Saturday Disney was cancelled. It worked interactively with its website "The Hub"

Presenters
Jordan Vandermade
Vicki Lin

From time to time you would see an appearance by Matthew Gibb or Dayna Vawdrey on the show. At the time they were the hosts of the Weekday Version of Studio 2 Saturday. After Studio 2 Saturday finished, Vicki Lin and Jordan Vandermade now host the Weekday Version of Studio 2 Saturday

the-hub.tv
the-hub.tv was a big part of Studio 2 Saturday. Presenters, Guests and Web-Ops would often chat on the website and often read out 'posts' by home viewers and sometimes even give out prizes. The site also worked alongside The Weekday Show, and was used much more frequently after the Saturday show was canceled.  The website was still running even after Studio 2 LIVE finished, but was closed down in August 2012, nearly two years after the show had ended.

External links
Studio 2 LIVE TVNZ Website
The Hub

References

2004 New Zealand television series debuts
2010 New Zealand television series endings
New Zealand children's television series
Television shows funded by NZ on Air
TVNZ 2 original programming